Reported Road Casualties Great Britain (RRCGB), formerly Road Casualties Great Britain (RCGB) and before that Road Accidents Great Britain (RAGB), is the official statistical publication of the UK Department for Transport (DfT) on traffic casualties, fatalities and related road safety data.  This publication, first produced in 1951, is the primary source for data on road casualties in Great Britain. It is based primarily on police STATS19 data. Data has been collected since 1926.

The remainder of the UK casualty statistics, those from Northern Ireland, are reported separately by the PSNI.

Published data
Data has been collected since 1926, in which year there were 4,886 fatalities in some 124,000 crashes. Between 1951 and 2006 a total of 309,144 people were killed and 17.6 million were injured in accidents on British roads. The highest number of deaths in any one year was 9,169 people in 1941 during World War II.  The highest figure during peacetime was 7,985 in 1966.

Figures for reported deaths, serious injuries and slight injuries have generally decreased since 1966. Since 1992, the ten-year drop in killed or seriously injured casualty numbers reported to the police, compared with the previous five-year average, has been about 40%.

In 1987, the government set the first national casualty reduction target.  The target set was that road casualties should drop by one-third by the year 2000 in comparison to the average numbers for the years 1981 to 1985.  The target was exceeded, with the number of fatalities dropping by 39% and the number of serious injuries dropping by 45% over that period.

In 1999, when Great Britain had the safest roads in Europe apart from Sweden, the government set a new national casualty reduction target, to be met by the year 2010.  The target for 2010, compared to the average for the years 1994 to 1998, was a reduction of 40% in the number of people Killed or Seriously Injured (KSI) casualties, a reduction of 50% the number of children KSI casualties and a reduction of 10% in the rate of people slightly injured per 100 million vehicle kilometres.  By 2009, the results were: killed or seriously injured 44% lower; children killed or seriously injured 61% lower and the slight casualty rate was 37% lower.

There is some concern about the completeness of the injury data and what can be concluded from it (see the Criticism section below).  This table gives data for sample years:-

Annual summary

Casualties by road type in 2008
Casualties by severity, built-up, non built-up and on motorways.

STATS19 data collection system
The police collect details of all incidents which they attend or become aware of within 30 days which occur on the highway in which one or more person is killed or injured and involving one or more vehicles using the STATS19 data collection system.

STATS19 is the reference number for the police form used to record incidents. STATS20 describes how to complete the form giving examples of how to correctly record different situations. STATS21 describes how STATS19 data should be checked for accuracy.

Additional information for RCGB is gathered from death registrations, coroners' reports and traffic and vehicle registrations.

STATS19 data is used in European Union road safety studies.

Criticism

Reported reduction in injury levels
The accuracy of the police STATS19 statistics, and thus much of the data published in the RCGB, and therefore its suitability for measuring trends in road casualties was examined in two studies in 2006 and has subsequently been commented on by the Department for Transport who concluded that the figures for deaths were accurate, however the actual total injuries is likely considerably higher than the reported figure, possibly three times higher.

A report published in the British Medical Journal in 2006 by M.Gill et al. compared police and Hospital Episode Statistics between 1996 and 2004 and concluded that although the police statistics showed a reduction in KSIs from 85.9 to 59.4 per 100,000 for the period the statistics for hospital admissions related to traffic accidents requiring hospital admission for the period did not. It concluded that the overall fall in police figures represented a fall in completeness of reporting of these injuries rather than an actual reduction of casualties.

Also in 2006 a report prepared for the DfT by H.Ward et al. noted that although the figures for fatalities were normally accurate, with no significant under-reporting there was more uncertainty in the statistics relating to injury. They recommended that it was insufficient to rely solely on the STATS19 data or any other single data source because different databases showed different elements of the story and that "A system of data triangulation should be used to compare and understand trends in road casualties." They noted that the definition of seriously injured in police reports was at least partially subjective, and there was some under-reporting (though less than is the case for lesser injuries). The report also noted that there were changes to the method used to estimate vehicle mileages in 1995 which would affect direct comparisons of figures spanning this year.

The Department for Transport acknowledged in their report for the year 2008 that a considerable proportion of non-fatal casualties are not known to the police. Based on additional sources including hospital records, surveys and compensation claims they estimate that the total number of road casualties in Great Britain each year is nearer to 800,000  [although this figure itself may be influenced by the growth in the so-called 'compensation culture']. The UK government is not convinced however that the reductions in reported injury levels do not reflect an actual decline. In 2008 the department changed the title of the report from 'Road Casualties Great Britain' to 'Reported Road Casualties Great Britain'.

Suppression of activity by vulnerable road users
Another independent report challenged the government's claim that falling casualty rates meant that roads were becoming 'much safer'. Mayer Hillman, John Adams and John Whitelegg suggest that roads may actually be  felt to be sufficiently dangerous as to deter pedestrians from using them. They compared rates for those whose transport options are most limited, the elderly and children and found that:
 Britain's child pedestrian safety record is worse than the average for Europe, in contrast to the better than average all-ages figure.
 Children's independent mobility is increasingly curtailed, with fear of traffic being cited as a dominant cause
 Distances walked have declined more than in other European countries
 Similar (though less well-defined) observations can be made regarding the elderly

Notes

References
References relating to Notes (above)
 
  
  

Other references

External links
 Road casualties in Great Britain: Annual reports
 STATS 19 defined at Office for National Statistics
Department for Transport - Statistics

Road safety
Road transport in the United Kingdom
Road safety in the United Kingdom
Road safety data sets